{{Infobox urban feature
|name=Fontana del Moro
|location=Piazza Navona, Rome, Italy
|place_type=Fountain
|image_place=Moor Fountain.jpg
|image_caption=Fontana del Moro, Piazza Navona
|designer=Giacomo della Porta
|imagesize=270
|coordinates=
|image_map=
 
|map_caption=Click on the map for a fullscreen view
}}

Fontana del Moro (Moor Fountain) is a fountain located at the southern end of the Piazza Navona in Rome, Italy. It represents a Moor, or African (perhaps originally meant to be Neptune), standing in a conch shell, wrestling with a dolphin, surrounded by four Tritons. It is placed in a basin of rose-colored marble.

History

The fountain was originally designed by Giacomo della Porta in 1575 with the dolphin and four Tritons. 16th-century artists including Gillis van den Vliete, Taddeo Landini, Simone Moschini and Giacobbe Silla Longhi sculpted the tritons, dragons and masks after the designs of della Porta. In 1653, the statue of the Moor, designed by Gian Lorenzo Bernini and sculpted by Giannantonio Mari, was added. In 1874, during a restoration of the fountain, the original statues were moved to the Galleria Borghese and replaced with copies by Luigi Amici.

In September 2011, the fountain was damaged after a vandal attacked it with a hammer. The vandal also damaged the Trevi Fountain'' that night.

See also
List of works by Gian Lorenzo Bernini
List of fountains in Rome
 Piazza Navona

References

External links
 

Moro
Rome R. VI Parione
Sculptures of gods
Dolphins in art
Seashells in art